Yury Viktorovich Fedotov (14 December 1947 – 16 June 2022) was a Russian diplomat. From 2010 to 2019 he served as executive director of the United Nations Office on Drugs and Crime (UNODC) and director-general of the United Nations Office at Vienna (UNOV) with the rank of Under-Secretary-General, after having previously served as the Ambassador of Russia to the United Kingdom.

Fedotov graduated from the Moscow State Institute of International Relations in 1971. He has held many foreign service positions to the UN and worked at Soviet embassies in Algeria and India.

In 2002 he became the Russian Federation's Deputy Minister for Foreign Affairs and held this post until 2005. From 2005 until 2010 he was Ambassador of Russia to the Court of St. James's.

Fedotov died in Austria on 16 June 2022, at the age of 74.

Career

Yury Fedotov was the executive director of the United Nations Office on Drugs and Crime (UNODC) at the rank of under-secretary-general, until 31 December 2019. He was appointed to this position by UN Secretary-General Ban Ki-moon on 9 July 2010. He was also director-general of the UN Office at Vienna (UNOV). Prior to this appointment, Fedotov participated in many discussions among the main deliberative bodies of the UN in New York City. He served as a member of the College of Commissioners of the former United Nations Monitoring, Verification and Inspection Commission (UNMOVIC) in Iraq.

References

External links

 Secretary-General appoints Yuri Fedotov of Russian Federation Executive Director of UNODC
 Biography of Yury Fedotov
 Speeches and interviews on Russian Embassy in the UK website

1947 births
2022 deaths
People from Sukhumi
Moscow State Institute of International Relations alumni
Soviet diplomats
Russian diplomats
Ambassador Extraordinary and Plenipotentiary (Russian Federation)
Ambassadors of Russia to the United Kingdom
Under-Secretaries-General of the United Nations